Long Hill is a  estate in Beverly, Massachusetts and is managed by the Trustees of Reservations. From 1916 to 1979, the estate was the summer home of Ellery Sedgwick, author and editor of The Atlantic Monthly. The estate contains a Federal style home with formal gardens,  of hiking trails, woodlands, meadows and an apple orchard.

References

External links 
 The Trustees of Reservations: Long Hill

The Trustees of Reservations
Houses in Beverly, Massachusetts
Parks in Essex County, Massachusetts
Gardens in Massachusetts
1979 establishments in Massachusetts
Protected areas established in 1979